The 1994 Humo European Open was a professional ranking snooker tournament that took place between 11 and 17 December 1994 at the Schijnpoort Arena in Antwerp, Belgium.

Defending champion Stephen Hendry won the tournament, defeating John Parrott 9–3 in the final.

Wildcard round

Main draw

References

European Masters (snooker)
European Open
European Open
European Open
Snooker in Belgium
Sports competitions in Antwerp